The barbthroats are a genus Threnetes of South American hummingbirds in the family Trochilidae.

Taxonomy
The genus Threnetes was introduced in 1852 by the English ornithologist John Gould. The name is from the Ancient Greek thrēnētēs meaning "mourner". The type species is the pale-tailed barbthroat. The genus contains three species.

The supposed "black barbthroats", described as T. grzimeki, are actually juvenile males of the rufous-breasted hermit (Glaucis hirsuta).

References

Bird genera
 
Taxonomy articles created by Polbot